Bingham is a village in Fayette County, Illinois, United States. The population was 83 at the 2010 census, down from 117 at the 2000 census.

The village was named after Judge Horatio Bingham. A post office was established in 1883.

Geography
Bingham is located in northwestern Fayette County at  (39.113898, -89.212460), within South Hurricane Township.

Demographics

As of the census of 2000, there were 117 people, 44 households, and 27 families residing in the village. The racial makeup of the village was 100.00% White, 
There were 44 households, out of which 36.4% had children under the age of 18 living with them, 34.1% were married couples living together, 11.4% had a female householder with no husband present, and 38.6% were non-families. 27.3% of all households were made up of individuals, and 9.1% had someone living alone who was 65 years of age or older. The average household size was 2.66 and the average family size was 3.30.

In the village, the population was spread out, with 25.6% under the age of 18, 16.2% from 18 to 24, 23.1% from 25 to 44, 28.2% from 45 to 64, and 6.8% who were 65 years of age or older. The median age was 33 years. For every 100 females, there were 108.9 males. For every 100 females age 18 and over, there were 117.5 males.

The median income for a household in the village was $20,938, and the median income for a family was $16,250. Males had a median income of $28,750 versus $16,875 for females. The per capita income for the village was $9,780. There were 42.1% of families and 39.2% of the population living below the poverty line, including 55.6% of under eighteens and 25.0% of those over 64.

References

Villages in Illinois
Villages in Fayette County, Illinois